Henry Clay is an unincorporated community and coal town located in Pike County, Kentucky, United States. It was also known as the Henry Clay Coal Camp.

References

Unincorporated communities in Pike County, Kentucky
Unincorporated communities in Kentucky
Coal towns in Kentucky